Sellan is a hamlet in west Cornwall, England, United Kingdom. It lies just northeast of Sancreed.

References

Hamlets in Cornwall